Get Stupid may refer to one the following topics:
 "Get Stupid", a 2004 song on the Mac Dre album Ronald Dregan: Dreganomics
 Get Stupid!, a 2005 book by Trevor Strong of the comedy team The Arrogant Worms
 "Get Stupid", a 2008 video interlude by Madonna featured on her Sticky & Sweet Tour
 "Get Stupid" (song), a 2015 song on the Aston Merrygold album Show Stopper